The Sundsvall Bridge is a bridge across the Sundsvall Bay in Sundsvall, Sweden. It crosses the Bay of Sundsvall, bypassing the city. The bridge roadway is classed as motorway and forms part of European Route E4.

Since 1 February 2015 there has been a charge of SEK 9 per car, light truck and bus. Heavy trucks are charged SEK 20.

It is the fourth longest bridge in Sweden.

References

External links
Broavgift Sundsvall Transportstyrelsen 5 December 2017 (in Swedish)

Toll bridges in Sweden
Sundsvall
Bridges completed in 2014
Buildings and structures in Sundsvall Municipality
2014 establishments in Sweden